Marilyn Allene Hickey (born July 1, 1931) is an American Christian minister and televangelist who teaches Bible studies both nationally and internationally.

Biography
Marilyn Allene Hickey was born on July 1, 1931, in Dalhart, Texas. When she was a young girl, Hickey's parents were professing Methodists and attended church only casually. Her family suffered from hereditary mental disorders according to one of her telecasts. Her father had it, after her grandfather and her great-grandfather that had it, even before the "devil and his imps" got to Marilyn, at the age of 36, she was the only one in her family not to suffer a mental disorder.

Also in her family, she also said that her family had a history of heart diseases, especially Hickey herself, that at age 11, she was told by her doctors she had an enlarged heart, and progressively got worse until she had surgery. She became a born again Christian when she was a teenager. In college, she studied Spanish, intending to become a public high school teacher.

She met Wallace Hickey at an Assemblies of God Church, where Wallace served as a pastor, and together on December 26, 1954, (just 1 day after Christmas), the couple were married. Around the same time, she and Wallace also met Dr. T.L. Osborn, a Pentecostal evangelist, who was 8 years Hickey's senior, when she and Wallace both had traveled around in her husband's car, doing tent revival meetings, in town, she also became lifelong friends with him, until she lost him, only 4 months, after she lost Wallace.

Hickey holds a Bachelor of Arts in Collective Foreign Languages from the University of Northern Colorado and an Honorary Doctorate of Divinity from Oral Roberts University.

Hickey has two children and four grandchildren. Hickey's husband of 57 years, Wallace, died after a long battle of Alzheimer's disease, in the care center of Denver, Colorado, on October 19, 2012, at age 87.

Today with Marilyn and Sarah TV program

Hickey has aired a television program since 1973 and, since 1996, has co-hosted it with her daughter Sarah Bowling (born February 1, 1968). Today with Marilyn and Sarah can be seen on various Christian networks such as the DayStar Network,  Channel C, TCT Network, Cornerstone Television Network, and independent stations in both the U.S. and internationally, as well as through her YouTube Channel. She has also been seen on the Trinity Broadcasting Network (TBN).

Missionary works

In 2012, Hickey held a three-day prayer and faith healing rally in Karachi, Pakistan which was attended by over 400,000 people. On 12 November 2016 with her 7th trip to Pakistan she aimed at reaching 1,000,000 people in a single meeting in Karachi.

Hickey has served as a member of the Board of Regents of Oral Roberts University.

See also
 Apologetics
 Charismatics
 Faith healing
 Full Gospel
 Glossolalia
 Pentecostalism

References

External links
 

American television evangelists
Living people
1931 births
People from Dalhart, Texas
People from Overland Park, Kansas
American evangelists
Women evangelists
American Pentecostal missionaries
Female Christian missionaries
Colorado Republicans
Oral Roberts University people
American Charismatics